Gabrielle Allyse Reece is an American professional volleyball player, sports announcer, fashion model and actress.

Early life

Reece was raised in Saint Thomas, U.S. Virgin Islands, an only child of Terry Glynn and Robert Eduardo Reece. Her father, who was Trinidadian, was killed in a plane crash when Gabrielle was five. She returned to the U.S. mainland for the eleventh grade, attending Keswick Christian School in St. Petersburg, Florida, when she took up sports. In 1989, she moved to New York City to pursue more rigorously a parallel career as a sports fashion model and also continue in her pro volleyball career.

Volleyball career
After graduation, Reece played on professional volleyball tours for several years.

Reece trained in golf for four years hoping to make it onto the LPGA but was unsuccessful. In 2009, she said, "... with young children, I simply didn't have the time for such a demanding game".

Modeling career
She appeared in several Elle layouts in the late 1980s and early 1990s. She has appeared on the covers of Outside, Shape, Women's Sports & Fitness, Elle, and Life.

Other work
In 2022, she appeared as herself in an episode of Billions.
In her April 2013 book titled My Foot Is Too Big for the Glass Slipper: A Guide to the Less Than Perfect Life, Reece writes that "to truly be feminine means being soft, receptive, and – look out, here it comes – submissive." She went on to further define her point in an April 16 interview on The Today Show by saying that she believes women being submissive in relationships is a sign of strength – not weakness. "We don’t worry about (men) having it all, so I don’t know where we got this idea to have it all".

Personal life
On November 30, 1997, Reece married big-wave surfer Laird Hamilton. They have two daughters. She and Hamilton also are raising Hamilton's daughter from his previous marriage to big wave surfer and clothing designer Maria Souza. The Hamilton-Reece family splits time residing in Hawaii and Malibu, California. In the latter, she is known as a member of the "Malibu Mob", a group of celebrity friends and neighbors that includes actor John Cusack, hockey player Chris Chelios, tennis player John McEnroe, and actor John C. McGinley.

References

External links

 Gabriellereece.com official site
 

1970 births
Living people
American women's beach volleyball players
Florida State Seminoles women's volleyball players
People from Saint Thomas, U.S. Virgin Islands
Sportspeople from St. Petersburg, Florida
American people of Trinidad and Tobago descent
Volleyball players from San Diego
United States Virgin Islands women's volleyball players
United States Virgin Islands models
Female models from Florida
Keswick Christian School alumni